George Flash (born 1909, died 22 November 1990) was an Israeli politician who served as a member of the Knesset for the General Zionists between 1951 and 1955.

Biography
Born in Reșița in Austria-Hungary (today in Romania), Flash was educated at a Hebrew high school, before studying law at the University of Vienna. Whilst a student he became involved with Zionist organisations, and was a member of the Zionist Students Association. He also became a member of the directorate of Hakoah Vienna.

In 1933, he made aliyah to Mandatory Palestine, where he became a member of the directorate of the Federation of General Zionists, and chairman of its foreign policy committee. He was also general secretary of the Israeli branch of Maccabi, later becoming chairman and chair of the Maccabi World directorate, and general secretary of the Citizens Union. During the mandate era, he served as a member of the Assembly of Representatives.

In 1951 he was elected to the Knesset on the General Zionists' list, but lost his seat in the 1955 elections. He died in 1990.

External links
 

1909 births
1990 deaths
People from Reșița
Romanian Jews
Austro-Hungarian Jews
Romanian emigrants to Mandatory Palestine
Jews in Mandatory Palestine
Israeli people of Romanian-Jewish descent
General Zionists politicians
Members of the Assembly of Representatives (Mandatory Palestine)
Members of the 2nd Knesset (1951–1955)
University of Vienna alumni